The Victoria Hotel is a Grade II listed building in Menai Bridge, Anglesey.

References

Grade II listed buildings in Anglesey
Hotels in Anglesey
Menai Bridge